Professor Aba A. Bentil Andam (born 1948) is a Ghanaian particle physicist who was President of the Ghana Academy of Arts and Sciences from 2017–2019. She is the first Ghanaian female physicist.

Early life and education
Aba A. Bentil Andam was born in Ghana in 1948 in Ajumako Kokoben. She had her secondary education at Mfantsiman Senior High School. She completed her undergraduate degree at the University of Cape Coast in Ghana (1969-1973), ⁣ where she majored in physics and minored in mathematics. She sought further education in Britain where she earned a master's degree from the University of Birmingham (1976-1977) and a Ph.D. from Durham University (1978-1981). At the University of Cape Coast and Durham University, she was the only woman physicist in the department during her time there.

Career 
In 1986, she became a chartered physicist and full member of the Institute of Physics. In addition to her scientific degrees, she is fluent in French, and has a number of different French language qualifications, including the Diplome de Langue d’Alliance Francaise de Paris; the French Proficiency Certificate of Ghana Institute of Languages; and the Certificate of Translation, Alliance Francaise de Paris.

In 1986 and 1987 she studied charmed mesons at the German research station DESY (Deutsches Elektronen-Synchrotron). Later, her research focused on radon and surveyed human exposure levels of the radioactive gas in Ghana. Andam was interested in determining how much radiation from radon Ghanaians were exposed to, and how she can reduce radon radiation exposure. She is also interested in radiation-based safety measures, such as; working out a safety standard for X-ray scans.

Beginning in 1987, she participated in the Ghana Science Clinics for Girls, where female students and scientists met. The scientists then acted as role models to the students. These clinics led to increased performance in the students who took part, and the retention rates from primary to university considerably increased. Andam is passionate about sharing her love of science with young women and encouraging them to take up science.

Andam has been a professor at the Kwame Nkrumah University of Science and Technology since 1981. She has headed the physics department since the mid 2000s, and from 2005 has been the WILKADO Chair of Science and Technology. She conducts research in applied nuclear physics at Kumasi's Nuclear Research Laboratory.  She also was a part-time lecturer at the University of Cape Coast. She has served as the UNESCO chair of the Women in Science and Technology in Africa's West African region between 1996 and 2002.

Honours and recognition 
She is a fellow of various different scientific organizations namely; The World Innovation Foundation (from 2002), Ghana Academy of Arts and Sciences (from 2003), and the Institute of Physics (from 2004).  She was the President of the Ghana Academy of Arts and Sciences (2017-2019), the second woman to hold this position.

Personal life
She was married to Professor Kwesi Akwansah Andam who was a Civil Engineer, an academician and a former Vice Chancellor. They had four children.

References

1948 births
Living people
Alumni of the University of Birmingham
Ghanaian physicists
Academic staff of Kwame Nkrumah University of Science and Technology
Particle physicists
University of Cape Coast alumni
Fellows of the Ghana Academy of Arts and Sciences
Alumni of Durham University Graduate Society